Barmore Island is a peninsula in Scotland located on the east of Knapdale, in the council area of Argyll and Bute. It is 1 and a half miles north from Tarbert.

The peninsula is attached to the main land by an narrow strip.

Shipwrecks 
The PS Chevaliar wrecked here in the year 1927.

The ship Nancy Glen is thought to have wrecked 400 feet near Barmore Island.

References 

Peninsulas of Scotland
Landforms of Argyll and Bute
Knapdale